Šverceri hlapić is a 1999 film produced by Nova TV and directed by Luka Juričić and Borko Perić. The film is best known for the acting debuts of Jadranka Đokić and Luka Juričić, who was also the film's director. The film premiered at the Istrian National Theater on 22 October 1999.

Cast
 Jadranka Đokić - Nataša Mrlek
 Luka Juričić - Don Pancettone
 Elvira - Miss Shoe
 Matija Ferlin - pomoćnik Miss Shoe
 Marko Juraga - Hlapić 2
 Siniša Majstorović - Kriminalac
 Samanta Milotić - Gita
 Martina Orlić - Sporedan lik
 Milan Peranović - Prodavac kremica
 Borko Perić - Hlapić 1
 Romina Vitasović - Lily Picek

External links
 Official website
 Šverceri hlapić at IMDb

References

1999 films
Croatian comedy-drama films